ASUE may refer to:
ASUE
ASUE (Germany) - Germany's Association for the Efficient and Environmentally Friendly Use of Energy.
Arizona State University's Eastern campus
A Series of Unfortunate Events, a children's book series written by Lemony Snicket.

Asue
Alfred Asue, a bishop from Equatorial Guinea
Awyu-asue, a language of West Papua
Sou-sou, or Esusu, a traditional method of saving money in Africa and the West Indies